The 2007–08 season of the Israeli Futsal League was the 2nd season of top-tier futsal under the Israel Football Association and 8th overall. The regular season started on 20 November 2007 and was concluded on 7 April 2008. The championship playoffs began on 8 April 2008 with semi-finals series and concluded with the championship final series from 17 to 24 April.

Hapoel Ironi Rishon LeZion were the defending champions and kept the title by defeating Yanshufei Agudat Sport Tel Aviv 2 games to 1 in the 2007–08 Championship Final series.

Regular season table

Championship playoffs

Calendar

Bracket

External links
Israeli Futsal League 2007-2008 IFA

References

Israeli Futsal League
Futsal
Israel